Tareh-ye Ahrar Abbasabad Molla Reza (also Romanized as Ţareḥ-ye Āḥrār ʿAbbāsābād Mollā Rez̤ā) is a village in Nehzatabad Rural District, in the Central District of Rudbar-e Jonubi County, Kerman Province, Iran. At the 2006 census, its population was 1,148, in 228 families.

References 

Populated places in Rudbar-e Jonubi County